Romny is the name of several rural localities in Russia:
Romny, Amur Oblast, a selo in Romnensky Rural Settlement of Romnensky District of Amur Oblast
Romny, Primorsky Krai, a selo in Krasnoarmeysky District of Primorsky Krai